The Economy of Saskatoon is quite diverse.  The city hosts the head-offices for several companies. Various grains, livestock, oil and gas, potash, uranium, wood and their spin off industries fuel the economy. The world's largest publicly traded uranium company, Cameco, and the world's largest potash producer, Nutrien, have corporate headquarters in Saskatoon. Nearly two-thirds of the world's recoverable potash reserves are located in the Saskatoon region.

Agri-Food and Biotechnology 
 Canadian Plasma Resources
 Guardian Biotechnologies 
 Great Western Brewing Company
 IL Therapeutics
 Prairie Plant Systems 
 Robin Hood Flour

Financial Services
 Affinity Credit Union
 First Nations Bank of Canada

Mining
 AREVA Resources Canada 
 Cameco 
 Potash Corporation of Saskatchewan
 Star Uranium

Technology
 International Road Dynamics
 SED Systems
 Mentor, a Siemens business (acquired Solido Design Automation)

Transportation and Logistics
  Canpotex
 Pronto Airways
 QA Technologies
 West Wind Aviation 
 Yanke Group

Utilities
 Saskatoon Light & Power
 YourLink

Wholesale and Retail Sales
 Farmers of North America
 Federated Co-operatives 
 Saskatoon Co-op

References

Saskatoon